Alexandra Kamieniecki (born September 1, 1996) is a Polish former figure skater. She is the 2014 Polish National Silver Medalist and the 2012 Polish national Champion. She is now a Medical Student at Gdańsk Medical University.

Programs

Competitive highlights

References

External links 
 

1996 births
Living people
Canadian people of Polish descent
Polish female single skaters
Figure skaters from Calgary